A gubernatorial election was held on 15 November 1998 to elect the Governor of ,  who is the southernmost and westernmost prefecture of Japan.

Candidates 

Masahide Ōta, 73, incumbent since 1990, endorsed by SDP, OSMP, JCP, LP and NSP.  
Keiichi Inamine, 65, former vice-governor, backed by LDP, New Okinawa and SPP.
Mitsuo Matayoshi, 54, a conservative Protestant preacher. He led his own party, know as World Economic Community Party.

Results

References 

Content in this edit is translated from the existing Japanese Wikipedia article at :ja:1998年沖縄県知事選挙; see its history for attribution.

1998 elections in Japan
Okinawa gubernatorial elections